Choi Joon-suk (born February 15, 1983) is a retired South Korean infielder. He batted and threw right-handed.

After a season in which he hit .321, with 22 home runs and 82 RBI, Choi won the 2010 KBO League Golden Glove Award as a first basemen.

See also 
 List of KBO career home run leaders

References

External links 
Career statistics and player information from Korea Baseball Organization

1983 births
Living people
Sportspeople from Daegu
South Korean baseball players
Lotte Giants players
Doosan Bears players
NC Dinos players
KBO League designated hitters
KBO League infielders